Tales from the Borderlands is an episodic interactive comedy graphic adventure sci-fi video game based on the Borderlands series. It was developed by Telltale Games under license from Gearbox Software, the developer of the Borderlands series, and 2K Games, its publisher. The game was released in November 2014 for Android, iOS, Microsoft Windows, OS X, PlayStation 3, PlayStation 4, Xbox 360, Xbox One, and Nintendo Switch. 

Set some time after the events of Borderlands 2, the game's story centers around Hyperion employee Rhys and Pandoran con-artist Fiona as they team up on an adventure to find and open a Vault. The game follows the episodic format that Telltale used for its titles The Walking Dead and The Wolf Among Us, where player choices and actions have somewhat significant effects on later story elements. Although the series received some criticism due to the aging game engine and repetition of gameplay from past Telltale Games, Tales from the Borderlands largely received critical acclaim. Particular praise was attributed to its strong characterization, emotional depth, creative setpieces, humorous writing and unexpected pathos.

Tales, like many of the other Telltale games, were pulled from sale following the studio's sudden closure in 2018. 2K Games was able to acquire the property and republished the series starting in February 2021. A successor, New Tales from the Borderlands, was released in October 2022.

Gameplay
Tales from the Borderlands is an episodic point-and-click graphic adventure comedy. The graphic of the game is similar to other Telltale's games. It was released in five episodes. The player is able to move the game's two playable characters, Rhys and Fiona, around the world's environment, interacting with different objects. Rhys has a cybernetic eye installed which enables him to scan items in the environments. The game also features several simple puzzles which involves players interacting with different items of interests.

Like the mainline Borderlands series, the game features a loot system in which players can collect cash scattered throughout the game's locations, which can be used to purchase items during certain points of the game. Gameplay mainly revolves around reacting to on-screen prompts and engaging in quick time events. In the game, players initiate conversation trees with non-player characters. Choices made by the player, which are often timed, influence story elements in future episodes, such as the player character's relationship with other characters.

Setting and characters
Tales takes place in the Borderlands universe, primarily on the planet Pandora. Long-standing fables of a Vault containing vast treasures on Pandora have drawn numerous "Vault Hunters" to the planet, as well as the Hyperion corporation who maintain military-like control of the planet from an orbiting base named Helios. The game occurs after the events of Borderlands 2. It has been discovered that there are numerous other Vaults scattered throughout the galaxy, leading to a search for more Vault Keys that can open these new vaults. 

The player separately controls the story's two protagonists Rhys (Troy Baker) and Fiona (Laura Bailey). Rhys is a Hyperion employee, who has been working with his best friend Vaughn (Chris Hardwick) to get promoted into the higher ranks of the company but is stymied by his new boss and rival Hugo Vasquez (Patrick Warburton). Fiona is a con-artist working on Pandora along with her younger sister Sasha (Erin Yvette), both who learned under their mentor and father figure Felix (Norman Hall). The story explores how the characters came together, showing common events from the perspective of both characters in a manner called the "Big Fish version of what happened" by Telltale's Kevin Bruner. Other new characters in the game include Rhys and Vaughn's co-worker Yvette (Sola Bamis), black market fencer August (Nolan North), bandit leader Bossanova (Jason Topolski), a mysterious masked stranger (Roger L. Jackson), hooligans Finch (Dave Fennoy) and Kroger (Adam Harrington), bandit lord and August's mother Vallory (Susan Silo), Atlas scientist Cassius Leclemaine (Phil LaMarr), and the robot Gortys (Ashley Johnson).

In addition to original characters, the game also features returning characters from the main Borderlands games (voiced by the same actors from the previous games) including Handsome Jack (Dameon Clarke), who appears as an artificial intelligence injected into Rhys' mind, businesswoman Mad Moxxi (Brina Palencia), gun salesman Marcus Kincaid (Bruce DuBose), the Hyperion Loader Bot (Raison Varner), madman Shade (Brad Jackson), Hodunk clan leader Tector (Joel McDonald), cyborg Vault Hunter Zer0 (Michael Turner), mechanic Scooter (Mikey Neumann), junk dealer Janey Springs (Catherine Moore) and her girlfriend, the ex-Atlas assassin Athena (Lydia Mackay), Vault Hunters Brick (Marcus M. Mauldin) and Mordecai (Jason Liebrecht), and the robot Claptrap (David Eddings).

Development
The concept of Tales bore out from the 2012 Spike Video Game Awards, according to Telltale's Steve Allison. Telltale and Gearbox had already worked together previously to bring Borderlands Claptrap robot to Telltale's Poker Night 2. Representatives from both Telltale and Gearbox were present at the ceremony at adjoining tables, and over the course of the event, the idea of combining their respective talents on a project came out. Following the ceremony, Telltale and Gearbox began to explore the possibilities, realizing that the Borderlands universe had a large number of characters with interesting stories that Telltale could build upon, as well as continuing to explore fan-favorite characters that the series had developed. Gearbox noted that with the three prior Borderlands games, they had created an interesting universe but as a first-person shooter, the player's interaction with characters in that world was limited, and saw the potential in having Telltale expand upon their universe in a meaningful manner.

Voice actors from the previous Borderlands games returned to voice characters in this game, including Dameon Clarke as Handsome Jack and David Eddings as Claptrap. Troy Baker (originally Sam Witwer) and Laura Bailey voice the two central characters, Rhys and Fiona. Additional voice actors include Nolan North as August, Patrick Warburton as Hugo Vasquez, Chris Hardwick as Vaughn, and Erin Yvette as Sasha.

While Tales was critically well-received, the title had not met management's expectations for financial returns compared to its other properties like The Walking Dead. According to co-director Nick Herman, about halfway through the series' release, Telltale's management considered pulling the series so that they could reassign the staff to more lucrative projects, but the project leads worked out a deal to retain a skeleton staff to see the game out through its final episodes. Eurogamers Jeffrey Matulef noted that the last episodes of the series seemed to be the best work that Telltale had done, likely as a result of those most committed to the project staying on as the skeleton staff. Because of the poor financial performance, Herman does not anticipate there will be a sequel to the series. Telltale's head of creative communications Job Stauffer refuted the sales figures and said that the sales were "not disappointing" but also that they were "not on the same level as The Walking Dead and Minecraft".

Telltale Games underwent a massive reduction in staff and ultimately closed in November 2018. Tales was one of several games that were pulled from digital storefronts in the wake of the liquidation of Telltale's assets. However, 2K Games stated in May 2019 that they are looking to take over the publishing rights to Tales as to bring it back to digital storefronts, as Skybound Entertainment had done for Telltale's The Walking Dead series. Following news that the Telltale brand had been revived in August 2019, one of Gearbox's writers for Borderlands 3, Sam Winkler, expressed interest in a potential Tales, though no plans had been confirmed.

Tales is considered canon to Gearbox, the events occurring between Borderlands 2 (released in 2012) and Borderlands 3 (released in 2019). To help bridge the gap, Gearbox released free DLC for Borderlands 2, Commander Lilith and the Fight for Sanctuary, in June 2019, which occurs following the events of Tales, after the crash of Helios Station onto Pandora. Vaughn and Cassius are both featured in the DLC. Both Rhys and Vaughn also appear as supporting characters in Borderlands 3.

Gearbox Software announced that they will be republishing Tales in digital form for Windows, PlayStation 4, and Xbox One as a single package containing all five episodes starting on February 17, 2021, with the only change being the absence of the comparison of the players' choice screens that were shown at the end of each episode.

On February 18, 2021, a Nintendo Switch version of Tales was announced, and was released on March 23, 2021.

Episodes 
The game was separated into five episodes, released in intervals. A physical disc-based release containing all five episodes was released on April 26, 2016 for personal computer and console versions.

Reception

Tales from the Borderlands received critical acclaim. Critics have praised it for its story, characters, action sequences, humor, choice driven gameplay, and faithfulness to the source material while criticism was mainly directed towards the game's graphical glitches.

Episode 1 – Zer0 Sum
Episode 1 – Zer0 Sum received "generally positive" reviews. Aggregating review website Metacritic gave the Microsoft Windows version 84/100 based on 43 reviews, the PlayStation 4 version 80/100 based on 15 reviews, and the Xbox One version 82/100 based on 8 reviews. The first episode was an honorable mention for Best Narrative for the 2015 Game Developers Choice Awards.

Episode 2 – Atlas Mugged
Episode 2 – Atlas Mugged received "generally positive" reviews. Metacritic gave the Microsoft Windows version 78/100 based on 38 reviews, the PlayStation 4 version 81/100 based on 11 reviews, and the Xbox One version 78/100 based on 5 reviews.

Episode 3 – Catch a Ride
Episode 3 – Catch a Ride received "generally positive" reviews. Metacritic gave the Microsoft Windows version 81/100 based on 24 reviews, the PlayStation 4 version 83/100 based on 12 reviews, and the Xbox One version 65/100 based on 6 reviews.

Episode 4 – Escape Plan Bravo
Episode 4 – Escape Plan Bravo received "generally positive" reviews. Metacritic gave the Microsoft Windows version 79/100 based on 27 reviews, and the PlayStation 4 version 78/100 based on 9 reviews.

Episode 5 – The Vault of the Traveler
Episode 5 – The Vault of the Traveler received "critical acclaim". Metacritic gave the Microsoft Windows version 86/100 based on 32 reviews, and the PlayStation 4 version 90/100 based on 7 reviews.

Awards

Sequel

A successor developed by Gearbox Software and published by 2K Games, titled New Tales from the Borderlands, was released for Microsoft Windows, Nintendo Switch, PlayStation 4, PlayStation 5, Xbox One, and Xbox Series X/S on October 21, 2022.

References
Notes

Footnotes

External links
 

2014 video games
Android (operating system) games
Borderlands (series) games
Episodic video games
Fiction with unreliable narrators
IOS games
LGBT-related video games
MacOS games
Nintendo Switch games
PlayStation 3 games
PlayStation 4 games
PlayStation Network games
Point-and-click adventure games
Single-player video games
Telltale Games games
Video game sequels
Video games developed in the United States
Video games scored by Cris Velasco
Video games scored by Jared Emerson-Johnson
Video games set on fictional planets
Windows games
Xbox 360 Live Arcade games
Xbox 360 games
Xbox One games